Clifford Blackburn Edgar (1857 – 20 March 1931) was a Coalition Conservative MP for Richmond in Surrey.

Educated at the University of Manchester (BSc) and the University of London (MusB), Edgar was involved with West African development for half a century, being a director of the Bank of British West Africa.

He won the seat in 1918, but lost it to an Independent Unionist in 1922.

He was a member of Surrey County Council and also Mayor of the Municipal Borough of Richmond (Surrey).

A photographic portrait of him, by Walter Stoneman, is in the collection of the National Portrait Gallery, London.

References

Sources
Whitaker's Almanack, 1919 to 1922 editions
British Parliamentary Election Results 1918–1949, compiled and edited by F.W.S. Craig (The Macmillan Press 1977)

Conservative Party (UK) MPs for English constituencies
Politics of the London Borough of Richmond upon Thames
Mayors of places in Surrey
Conservative Party (UK) councillors
1857 births
1931 deaths
Alumni of the Victoria University of Manchester
Alumni of the University of London
English justices of the peace
Deputy Lieutenants